Brahmaea ardjoeno is a moth in the family Brahmaeidae. It was described by Kalis in 1934. It is found on Java and Borneo and possibly in the Philippines (Luzon, Mindoro, Panay, Negros and Mindanao).

References

Natural History Museum Lepidoptera generic names catalog

Brahmaeidae
Moths described in 1934